Wan Abdul Kadir Che Man (born 1946) is a Thai-Malay scholar and separatist politician. He was the president of Bersatu, a former umbrella group of separatists in south Thailand. He lives in exile in Malaysia.

During the 1990s, he was a lecturer in the department of history, University of Brunei Darussalam, and later an associate professor at the International Islamic University Malaysia.

Selected works 
 
 
 
 National Integration and Resistance Movement: The Case of Muslims in Southern Thailand In: Volker Grabowsky (ed.), Regions and National Integration in Thailand, 1892-1992 Harrassowitz Verlag. 1995, pp. 232-250.

References 

Living people
Wan Kadir Che Man
Malay people
Wan Kadir Che Man
Year of birth missing (living people)